Henrique "Kiko" Pellicano (born February 28, 1974) is a Brazilian sailor. He won the bronze medal in the Tornado Class at the 1996 Summer Olympics in Atlanta along with Lars Grael. Pellicano hails from a family of sailors, with his sister Márcia being a veteran of three Olympics who won a gold medal at the 1995 Pan American Games. He has competed in many long-distance sailing competitions, including the Volvo Ocean Race 2005-06 on the boat Brasil 1.

References

1974 births
Sportspeople from Rio de Janeiro (city)
Brazilian male sailors (sport)
Sailors at the 1996 Summer Olympics – Tornado
Sailors at the 2000 Summer Olympics – Tornado
Olympic sailors of Brazil
Olympic bronze medalists for Brazil
Olympic medalists in sailing
Living people
Medalists at the 2004 Summer Olympics
Volvo Ocean Race sailors